Georgia participated in the Junior Eurovision Song Contest 2010 which took place on 20 November 2010, in Minsk, Belarus. Georgian Public Broadcaster (GPB) was responsible for organising their entry for the contest. Mariam Kakhelishvili was externally selected to represent Georgia with the song "Mari Dari". Georgia placed fourth with 109 points.

Background

They have never missed an edition of the contest, and have won at the  contest.

Before Junior Eurovision

National final 
Georgia selected their Junior Eurovision entry for 2010 through a national final consisting of 11 songs. The winner was Mariam Kakhelishvili, with the song, "Mari Dari".

Artist and song information

Mariam Kakhelishvili
The winning contestant, Mariam Kakhelishvili, is a singer from Georgia managed by composer Giga Kukhiadnidze and Bzikebi Studio.

Mari Dari
"Mari Dari" is a song by Georgian singer Mariam Kakhelishvili. It represented Georgia during the Junior Eurovision Song Contest 2010. It is composed by Giga Kukhianidze with lyrics from both Kukhianidze and Kakhelishvili. Although it consists of mostly meaningless words, it contains a few words in Georgian, including , meaning sunshine.

At Junior Eurovision
During the running order draw which took place on 14 October 2010, Georgia was drawn to perform tenth on 20 November 2010, following Belgium and preceding Malta.

Final
During the final, Mariam Kakhelishvili performed amongst four background dancers, who wore white outfits and pink gloves and wigs. Mariam Kakhelishvili placed fourth at the Junior Eurovision Song Contest 2010, receiving 109 points for her song "Mari Dari".

Voting

Notes

References 

2010 in Georgia (country)
2010
Georgia